The 2006 Waveney District Council election took place on 4 May 2006 to elect members of Waveney District Council in England. This was on the same day as other local elections.

Summary

Ward results

References

2006 English local elections
May 2006 events in the United Kingdom
2006
2000s in Suffolk